Oberthal may refer to:

Oberthal, Saarland, a municipality in Saarland, Germany
Oberthal, Switzerland, a municipality in the canton of Bern, Switzerland